Milivoj Radović (22 February 1915 – 17 February 1987) was a Yugoslav fencer. He competed in the individual and team sabre events at the 1936 Summer Olympics.

References

External links
 

1915 births
1987 deaths
Yugoslav male sabre fencers
Olympic fencers of Yugoslavia
Fencers at the 1936 Summer Olympics